Ricardo Chamorro Delmo (born January 1, 1977) is a Spanish politician and a member of the Congress of Deputies for Vox.

Delmo is a lawyer by training and holds a law degree from the University of Navarra. In the Spanish general election of April 2019, he was elected to represent the Ciudad Real constituency in the Congress of Deputies and was re-elected in the November election of that year.

References 

1977 births
Living people
Members of the 13th Congress of Deputies (Spain)
Members of the 14th Congress of Deputies (Spain)
Vox (political party) politicians
21st-century Spanish lawyers